× Galiasperula is a monotypic genus of flowering plants in the family Rubiaceae. The genus contains only one species, × Galiasperula ferdinandi-coburgii, which is a hybrid of Asperula purpurea and Galium degenii. It is found in south-east Europe.

References

External links 
 Galiasperula in the World Checklist of Rubiaceae

Monotypic Rubiaceae genera
Rubieae
Plant nothogenera